Samata Pattinson (born 23 January 1987) is a British-born Ghanaian fashion entrepreneur. She is known for her work as CEO of Suzy Amis Cameron's Red Carpet Green Dress organisation, which, as part of its activities, delivers sustainable fashion on the red carpet at the Oscars each year. Samata has contributed to, The Guardian, EuroNews, Vogue and Huffington Post and others. Her work in the fields of fashion and sustainability have received coverage from different magazines.

Early life and education 

Born in Cambridge, England, Samata is the middle daughter of Ghanaian parents and has two sisters. Her paternal grandfather was a royal of Ghana's oldest Kingdom, Yoo Naa III of the Kingdom of Dagbon. She attended Catholic Primary schools before attending Perse School For Girls from Secondary. Samata studied a master's degree in economics, finance and management at Queen Mary University of London.

Fashion career 
Samata is an autodidact designer who began her fashion career as a PR Director for King's Road boutique Elival. In 2005, Samata launched her own clothing working with Ken Livingstone on the Festival of Youth Arts Fashion in Piccadilly Circus, going on to become the first black British female to show during Nolcha Fashion Week, New York. Samata has been invited to Number 10 Downing Street by both Gordon Brown and the Cameron administration for her work in the fashion industry. She was announced as the young designer winner of Suzy Amis Cameron's Red Carpet Green Dress contest, an international sustainable design initiative on the Oscars' red carpet in 2011. She is also known for her Bloomsbury's 'Fashion Designer's Resource Book', and for her work as producer and presenter of short environmental video 'Designing Change'.

Fashion journalism and broadcasting 
Samata was Fashion Editor of The Talent Magazine presented at the Channel 4 Magazine launch and styling actor Nicholas Holt for the first cover issue. Samata's journalism work notably covers the subject of sustainable fashion and fashion enterprise. Her London Fashion Week coverage for The Guardian coined the phrase 'Eco-Ghosting'. Samata's interviewees include Suzy Amis Cameron, Missi Pyle, Dame Vivienne Westwood and Christopher Bailey. In 2016 Samata narrated, co-directed and co-produced short documentary about sustainable fashion entitled Designing Change with Suzy Amis Cameron. She has appeared on ITV News At Ten, ITV News at Six, and others. She was asked by ITV News to pass an official comment on the appointment of fellow Ghanaian Edward Enninful as the Editor of Vogue UK in addition to the role of women in broadcasting. In 2019 she interviewed Christopher Raeburn at the Copenhagen Fashion Summit.

Published work 
Bloomsbury Publishing published Samata's book the Fashion Designer's Resource Book in February 2013. Samata writes poetry and fiction, and in 2006 was invited to perform spoken word at the Tate Modern for the Surrealism and Minimalism Festival. Samata is the author of popular women's empowerment book, THE TRIBE™ Empowerment Journal, her collective THE TRIBE counts musician Shingai Shoniwa and journalists Shaunagh Connaire and Charlene White as members.

Public speaking 
Samata has lectured and spoken at conferences and fashion colleges such as SXSW Eco, Central St Martins, London College of Fashion, Berkeley, Ravensbourne and Fashion Institute of Technology. She is known for her strong views on sustainability which have been featured in publications such as Reuters, Business Insider, Business Of Fashion, Harper's Bazaar, Wonderland China, Yahoo Finance and WWD. In 2020, Samata was selected by Cambridge University to champion their new series for the Cambridge Institute for Sustainability Leadership entitled 'Future we Want initiative', in addition to sharing insight for the inaugural IPBES, Global Biodiversity Podcast - Nature Insight. Samata, is a proponent of intersectional environmentalism, and is vocal about the importance of representation within the fashion industry for BIPOC groups and black creatives, and "celebrating coverage equally from global platforms, from Vogue Poland to Wonderland China".

The Oscars & Sustainable Design 
Through Red Carpet Green Dress, Samata's design, educational and thought-leadership work with pioneers such as Vivienne Westwood, Louis Vuitton and Tesla has frequented the red carpet at the Annual Academy Awards since 2012. She has made appearances at the Environmental Media Awards and the Oscars amongst other sustainability initiatives. Her work style has earned her the moniker of being 'indefatigable' by Hollywood Director James Cameron, whom she co-hosted the RCGD Global Pre-Oscar Event within 2020.  Samata was cited by LOHAS Magazine as one of the Top 100 Women in their 'Green Women Power List 100' for her work leading sustainable change in 2021.

Philanthropy 
In 2006, Samata recorded a spoken word youth charity single for a music project entitled Enfants Soldats to raised awareness about child soldiers. In December 2007, Samata organised a student fashion show as part of a fundraising concert in Freetown, Sierra Leone for a public sanitation project, with SWAY, Dawn Richards, and WFP initiative CatWALK the World. In September 2009, Samata designed costumes for the ITV News team as part of the 'Newsroom's Got Talent' fundraiser benefitting Leonard Cheshire Disability and Helen & Douglas House Hospice for Children and Young Adults. The then-designer exclusively dressed the likes of Romilly Weeks, journalist Steve Scott and Katie Derham for a Grease tribute performance, in addition to donating a gown.

Associated organisations and honours 
 Women for Women International charity

Samata is one of Ghana's prominent fashion industry members and was invited by High Commissioner Kwaku Danso-Boafo to attend the Screen Nation 'Sons and Daughters of Ghana' at the Ghanaian High Commission. Samata judged the Top Model of Colour finale in The Gambia, meeting President of The Gambia, Yahya AJJ Jammeh.

References 

People from Cambridge
Living people
British women journalists
Ghanaian women journalists
British fashion designers
English people of Ghanaian descent
1987 births
Ghanaian fashion designers
Ghanaian women fashion designers
British women fashion designers